Queen of Peace High School may refer to:

Queen of Peace High School (Illinois), in Burbank, Illinois
Queen of Peace High School (New Jersey), in North Arlington, New Jersey